Joseph-Étienne Dussault (17 October 1884 – 25 December 1943) was a Liberal party member of the House of Commons of Canada. He was born in Lévis, Quebec and became a contractor, editor and industrialist.

Dussault was educated at the Quebec Seminary. He was a municipal politician, a councillor for Lévis, Quebec from 1911 to 1919.

He was first elected to Parliament at the Lévis riding in the 1925 general election and re-elected in 1926. Dussault was defeated in the 1930 election by Émile Fortin of the Conservative party, but won the seat back in the 1935 election. After completing the term of the 18th Canadian Parliament, Dussault did not seek another term in the 1940 election.

References

External links
 

1884 births
1943 deaths
Liberal Party of Canada MPs
Members of the House of Commons of Canada from Quebec